Eric Charles "Erock" Friedman (born June 28, 1984) is an American musician, best known as the current guitarist for Tremonti and former touring guitarist and backing vocalist for Creed. He played with the band on their 2009 United States reunion tour with Staind and their 2010 Tour with Skillet. He is the former lead guitarist for the band Submersed and also the former lead guitarist for Daughters of Mara. Submersed and Daughters of Mara both disbanded in 2008. He also currently plays lead guitar and co writes for the rock band Hemme. At the age of thirteen Friedman was the youngest guitarist at the time to be fully endorsed by Fender. His first introduction to Mark Tremonti was at a NAMM show where his then manager introduced them both. They subsequently jammed at one of the Rivera amp booths and noticed, that although they had different styles, (Tremonti being heavily influenced by metal and Friedman Blues), they both complemented each other.

Career

Early years 
It all started for Friedman when his teenage guitar hero Kenny Wayne Shepherd pulled him onstage for a jam session during his set at the Galaxy Theatre (Santa Ana, CA) in 1996. Shortly after he began playing in his own blues outfit called The Eric Friedman Band and was endorsed by Fender at the age of 13. Eric opened up for acts such as Buddy Guy, Jimmie Vaughan, and Jonny Lang. He had a developmental record deal with Steve Vai's label Favored Nations at 15.

Submersed 
In 2000, Eric started a rock band called Blacsun that had demos produced by Brett Hestla (Virgos, Dark New Day). In the same year, he became the lead guitarist for the band Submersed. He performed on their debut album, In Due Time. Friedman left prior to the band's second album, Immortal Verses, which was released later that year before the band disbanded in 2008. He was also the guitarist for Daughters of Mara during this time, who also broke up in 2008. He then went on to play with former TNA Impact Wrestling star Christy Hemme along with former Submersed drummer, Garrett Whitlock.

Creed 
In addition to Kenny Wayne Shepherd, Friedman is influenced by Mark Tremonti of Creed and Alter Bridge and has since formed a close friendship with Tremonti, who requested for Friedman to perform as Creed's rhythm guitarist on tour. Friedman states that he grew up listening to Creed's music, particularly their debut album My Own Prison. While on tour with Creed, he provides rhythm guitar and backing vocals. He also performs a guitar solo with Tremonti on "What If." He appeared as a touring member on Creed's record-breaking live DVD, Creed Live. It has also been announced that Creed will reportedly be releasing a new song called "More Than This" which will feature Friedman on guitar. Friedman has also appeared in interviews and several promotional photos and videos. All of this has led to rumors of Friedman officially joining Creed, and the band has stated that they have discussed this, but nothing has been confirmed. Friedman returned to Creed in 2012 for the band's 2 Nights Tour.

Tremonti 

Friedman was featured on Mark Tremonti's debut solo album, All I Was, playing guitar, bass and singing background vocals. He is featured in the music video of "You Waste Your Time" He is a current member of the band and was part of the album, Cauterize, that was released in June 2015, and part of Dust, which was released in April 2016.

Projected 
In 2012, Friedman joined the supergroup Projected, alongside Sevendust's John Connolly, Vinnie Hornsby and Creed/Alter Bridge drummer Scott Phillips. Their debut album Human was released on September 18, 2012. Their recent work was Ignite My Insanity which was released under Rat Pak Records on July 21, 2017.

References 

Living people
American rock guitarists
American male guitarists
Songwriters from California
Lead guitarists
Rhythm guitarists
1984 births
Guitarists from California
Creed (band) members
Projected members
Tremonti (band) members
21st-century American guitarists
21st-century American male musicians
American male songwriters